The 2002 Qasim Nagar massacre was the killing of 29 Hindu labourers in Qasim Nagar on the outskirts of Jammu city in the erstwhile Indian state of Jammu and Kashmir by militants

Background
Killings of civilians had been intermittent but regular feature of the Insurgency in Jammu and Kashmir. Several prior incidents like Gawkadal massacre, Handwara massacre and Hawal massacre are some of the brutal ones.

The attack
On 13 July 2002, around 8 pm, up to eight suspected militants walked into the Qasimnagar slum on the outskirts of Jammu Disguised as Hindu holy men. They then threw three or four grenades before opening fire with automatic weapons (AK-47s). Within minutes 24 people, all Hindus were dead. Three more died later in hospital and at least 30 were injured, some critically. The dead included 13 women and a child. The gunmen escaped into the thickly wooded hills nearby. The victims were listening to the commentary of Indian-England cricket match.

There was a power cut at that time and many had gathered around a radio to listen to cricket commentary being broadcast live from Lord's Cricket Ground. Most of those killed were very poor labourers who lived in makeshift sheds fabricated from discarded apple crates. The dead included two blind beggars, 13 women and one child.

Aftermath
On 15 July, a complete bandh was observed in Jammu in protest against the incident.

British Foreign Secretary Jack Straw condemned the massacre saying "Terrorism be it in Jammu, Kashmir or anywhere else only serves to renew the determination of the free world to fight this evil. My thoughts are with the families and friends of those who suffered". United States, Britain, and France also condemned the weekend attack.

US Secretary of State Colin Powell spoke to External Affairs Minister Yashwant Sinha and condemned the massacre which he described as a "terrorist act". The State Department also released one-para statement on behalf of Mr Powell saying: 
I condemn the vicious killing of over 20 persons in Jammu yesterday. The people of this region deserve peace and development, not the suffering imposed upon them by terrorist thugs who are beyond the pale of the civilised world. The perpetrators of this heinous act are proving once again that they do not have the interest of the Kashmiri people at heart, but rather seek to undermine efforts to ease tensions in the region.

Russia's Ministry of Foreign Affairs, in a communication with the Ministry of External Affairs here, said: 
The present terrorist act in Jammu and Kashmir like yesterday's attack on a group of foreign tourists in the north of Pakistan form part of the same chain of international terrorism which present today a major threat to peace and security, including in South Asia.

We emphasise that the first step in ending terrorism in Jammu and Kashmir is the consistent implementation of commitments given by the Government of Pakistan for preventing activities of terrorist groups on the territory under its control.

Arrests 
The Director General of Jammu and Kashmir Police said that "Pakistan-based militant outfit Lashkar-e-Taiba" is responsible for the attack. Subsequently, Indian Police arrested Mohammad Abdullah alias Abu Talah of Lashkar-e-Taiba in connection with this massacre. Seven more militants belonging to Lashkar-e-Taiba were arrested later.

See also
1998 Wandhama massacre
Chittisinghpura massacre

References

21st-century mass murder in India
Massacres in 2002
Persecution of Hindus
Persecution by Muslims
Mass shootings in India
Terrorist incidents in India in 2002
Islamic terrorism in India
2002 in India
Massacres in Jammu and Kashmir
Violence against Hindus in India
Islamic terrorist incidents in 2002
July 2002 events in India
2002 mass shootings in Asia
2002 murders in India
Massacres of Hindus in Kashmir
Kashmir conflict